Parthenia may refer to:

Parthenia (music), the first printed collection of music for keyboard in England
Parthenia (Mauretania), a town and bishopric in the Roman province of Mauretania Sitifensis
Parthenia (Paphlagonia), a town of ancient Paphlagonia
, a United States Navy patrol vessel in commission from 1917 to 1919 or 1920
Parthenia (horse), a horse of the Greek mythological figure Marmax that was buried with him alongside his other horse Eripha
Parthenia river, a river mentioned in Greek mythology of Marmax with the river named after his similarly-named horse Parthenia
 Parthenia, an obsolete name for Euparthenia, a genus of molluscs